"I Still Can't Get Over Loving You" is a 1983 song written and performed by Ray Parker Jr. It was the lead single from his Woman Out of Control album of the same year, and it reached #12 on the Billboard Hot 100 in early 1984. It was Parker's fifth top 20 hit, the sixth being 1984's "Ghostbusters".

Background
The song is an up-tempo ballad with electronic instruments.
While initially the song speaks of lost love and an ended relationship, the lyrics gradually take a considerably more sinister tone, ultimately implying that the man either is stalking his former girlfriend, or potentially preparing to do harm to her. A turning point in the tone occurs when Parker borrows a line from  The Police's "Every Breath You Take", "Every breath you take, I'll be watching you." It is summarily followed by closing lines which indicate that the relationship has taken a dark turn:  "There's no way that this thing is through, no; Not yet, I ain't through lovin' you; I'm gettin' mad, girl, don't you ever try to leave, no, no; It'll be the last thing you'll ever do."

Charts

Weekly charts

Year-end charts

References

1983 singles
Ray Parker Jr. songs
Songs written by Ray Parker Jr.
1983 songs
Arista Records singles
Torch songs